Mount Healthy may refer to:

Places
United States
 Mount Healthy, Indiana
 Mount Healthy, Ohio
 Mount Healthy High School
 Mount Healthy Heights, Ohio

British Virgin Islands
 Mount Healthy windmill, Tortola